Phillips, formerly known as Phillips the Auctioneers (briefly as Phillips de Pury), is a British auction house. It was founded in London in 1796, and has head offices in London and in New York City. It was owned by the Mercury Group, a Russian luxury goods company.

History 
Phillips was founded in 1796 by Harry Phillips, who had been a clerk to James Christie. The business held twelve auctions in its first year and soon became successful. Napoleon and Beau Brummel were among the early patrons. Harry Phillips died in 1840, and the business passed to his son William Augustus, who renamed it Phillips & Son; when his son-in-law Frederick Neale joined in 1882, the company became Phillips, Son & Neale. It was renamed Phillips in the 1970s; it was usually referred to as Phillips, the Auctioneers.

In 1999 a majority stake in the company was sold to venture capitalists 3i, who resold it shortly after for a considerable profit. The company was bought in 1999 by Bernard Arnault of LVMH Moët Hennessy – Louis Vuitton. After a series of disastrous sales and extremely heavy losses Bonhams bought the UK operations of Phillips in 2001 and merged them into the Bonhams name. Most of the rump of the business was closed; some smaller departments were acquired by Simon de Pury and Daniella Luxembourg, who traded under the name Phillips de Pury & Company. In 2002 Simon de Pury acquired majority control of the firm. The company opened its European headquarters in Howick Place, London, in early 2008.

On 6 October 2008, the company was purchased by the Russian Mercury Group, which paid approximately $60 million for it. Simon De Pury sold his remaining shares to Mercury in late 2012, and left the company. The name was changed back to Phillips.

References 

London auction houses
 
Retail companies established in 1796
1796 establishments in England